Kudrat Ullah Mandal was a Bangladesh Awami League politician and member of parliament for Mymensingh-9.

Career
Mandal was elected to parliament from Mymensingh-9 as a Bangladesh Awami League candidate in 1973.

At the conclusion of a 2012 exhibition in Mymensingh of photographs recollecting the Bangladesh Liberation War, he was posthumously awarded a crest for his contribution to the war.

He had a younger brother, Akram Hossain Mandal, who served two terms as chairman of Haluaghat Union Parishad.

References

Awami League politicians
1st Jatiya Sangsad members
Year of birth missing (living people)
People from Mymensingh District